Thomas Oscar Quinn (April 25, 1864 – July 24, 1932) was a Major League Baseball catcher.

Sources

Major League Baseball catchers
Pittsburgh Alleghenys players
Baltimore Orioles (AA) players
Pittsburgh Burghers players
Binghamton Crickets (1880s) players
Albany Governors players
Syracuse Stars (minor league baseball) players
Indianapolis Hoosiers (minor league) players
Baseball players from Maryland
Sportspeople from Annapolis, Maryland
1864 births
1932 deaths
19th-century baseball players